William Gibson was a Scottish footballer who played as a full back for Morton and Dumbarton in his native country during the 1920s, also spending time in the United States where he featured for three American Soccer League clubs, and in Northern Ireland, winning the 1930–31 Irish League with Glentoran and also representing the Irish League XI in October 1930.

References 

Scottish footballers
Dumbarton F.C. players
Scottish Football League players
Year of birth missing
Year of death missing
Footballers from Inverclyde
Greenock Morton F.C. players
Association football defenders
Scottish expatriate footballers
American Soccer League (1921–1933) players
Bethlehem Steel F.C. (1907–1930) players
New Bedford Whalers players
Boston Soccer Club players
Scottish expatriate sportspeople in the United States
Expatriate soccer players in the United States
Irish League representative players
NIFL Premiership players
Glentoran F.C. players